The titles of Count of Châteauroux and Duke of Châteauroux take their name from the commune of Châteauroux, located in the Indre département of central France, and have changed hands several times.

After initially being awarded in 1616 by the head of the main branch of the Bourbon-Conde family, Henry II de Bourbon, prince de Condé, to his son Armand of Bourbon, it remained in the Armand line until its extinction in 1685, when it was passed along with the entirety of Armand's estate to his younger brother, François Louis de Bourbon.

Fearing disunity in the Bourbon line, it became one of the estates confiscated by Constable de Bourbon, and was given by Francis I and Louise of Savoy to Antoine, Duke of Lorraine, and his wife, Renée of Bourbon, sister of the Constable. Nicolas of Lorraine, son of Duke Antoine, was created Duke of Mercœur and a peer of France in 1569. His son Philippe Emmanuel left a daughter, who married the duc de Vendôme in 1609.

References

Dukes of Châteauroux